In the Heights is a musical with concept, music, and lyrics by Lin-Manuel Miranda and a book by Quiara Alegría Hudes. The story is set over the course of three days, involving characters in the largely Dominican American neighborhood of Washington Heights in Upper Manhattan, New York City.

After a 2005 tryout in Waterford, Connecticut and a 2007 Off-Broadway run, the show opened on Broadway in March 2008. It was nominated for thirteen Tony Awards and won four, including Best Musical. A film adaptation of the musical was released in June 2021.

Synopsis

Act 1
As the sun rises on the hottest day of the summer, Usnavi de la Vega, the owner of a small bodega in Washington Heights, chases away a small-time vandal, Graffiti Pete, before introducing the audience to the corner he lives on and some of its many residents: Abuela Claudia, a matriarchal figure who helped to raise Usnavi among others; Usnavi's young, lazy cousin Sonny who helps run the bodega; Daniela and Carla, who run the local salon; and Kevin and Camila Rosario, who run the cab company ("In the Heights").

As the day begins, the Rosarios' daughter Nina arrives home from her first year at Stanford University. Often considered the "one who made it out" and the pride of the corner, Nina dreads telling her parents and neighbors the truth of her return home: that she dropped out of Stanford because she had to work two jobs to maintain her tuition, leading to her getting poor grades and losing her scholarship ("Breathe"). As she tries to find her parents to tell them the news, she runs into Benny, Usnavi's best friend and an employee of Kevin's who has been temporarily left in charge of the dispatch while Kevin seeks to solve a financial problem. Clearly harboring latent romantic feelings for one another, Benny and Nina reconnect ("Benny's Dispatch").

Elsewhere, Vanessa, an employee of Daniela's at the salon and aspiring fashion designer (with whom Usnavi has long been infatuated), dreams of one day leaving the corner and getting an apartment in the West Village ("It Won't Be Long Now"). While she is on a break at the salon, Sonny asks her out on a date on Usnavi's behalf, and she accepts; Usnavi rejoices at his success but worries that Vanessa may forget about him and the rest of the community when she moves.

Nina reunites with her parents and is ultimately forced to reveal that she dropped out. Her parents are stunned at this revelation (as well as her dishonesty) and Kevin grows devastated that he has been unable to provide for his family, fearing that he has continued the cycle started by his father, a poor tenant farmer ("Inútil"). Nina escapes to the salon to seek comfort from Vanessa, but Daniela and Carla insist on giving her a makeover and subjecting her to their gossip about the goings-on in the neighborhood, specifically about Nina and Vanessa's respective love interests. The attention turns once more to Nina and her successes, forcing Nina to again reveal the truth about dropping out of Stanford and leave exasperatedly. ("No Me Diga").

As Usnavi closes up shop, he, Benny, Sonny, and Graffiti Pete discover that the bodega has sold a winning lottery ticket worth $96,000. The news gets out and the entire block begins to fantasize about what they would do if they won the small fortune ("96,000"). As the excitement dies down, Abuela Claudia sits down to feed the birds and reminisces about her childhood in Cuba and her life in relative poverty, and the events that have led her to where she is today. With tears of gratitude, she reveals that she holds the winning lottery ticket, and thanks her years of patience and faith for bringing her this fortune ("Paciencia y Fe").

Elsewhere, Nina finds solace in Benny, who takes her on a walk down the street corner and reminisces with her, reminding her of her childhood and her home. Nina expresses her doubts about her own self-worth to Benny, but he reassures her that she is destined for greatness ("When You're Home"). As they head to Nina's house for dinner, the local Piragua Guy continues his day selling piraguas through the intense heat and competing with Mister Softee ("Piragua").

Kevin and Camila host Nina, Benny, Usnavi, Vanessa, and Abuela Claudia for dinner where Kevin announces that he has sold the car service to pay for Nina's tuition. Nina and Camila are shocked. Benny, who had long dreamed of taking over the car service, is outraged and confronts Kevin over his decision. Kevin insists that Rosario's is a family business and that Benny will never be family; Benny subsequently leaves in a huff and Nina, refusing to accept the money, follows him out.

Usnavi soon arrives at a local club for his date with Vanessa, but is overly nervous and aloof, leading Vanessa to dance with other guys to make him jealous; Usnavi soon finds his own dance partner and tries to make Vanessa jealous in turn. Nina follows Benny to the club to apologize for her father's decision but Benny, already drunk, angrily brushes her off. Tensions rise in the club as the two couples cope with their own jealousy, culminating in Benny punching a man dancing with Nina, causing a fight to break out ("The Club"). Suddenly, the power goes out throughout the city as a result of the intense heat and humidity. The neighborhood descends into chaos as Usnavi and Vanessa, as well as Benny and Nina, desperately try to find their way back to one another. Sonny and Graffiti Pete, fearing looters, set off fireworks to distract potential robbers as well as to light everyone else's way home. Usnavi reunites with Abuela Claudia, who shows him her lottery winnings. Benny and Nina find each other amid the chaos, and despite initially arguing, they finally kiss ("Blackout").

Act 2
Nina and Benny spend the night together in Benny's apartment as Kevin frantically searches for her all night; Benny worries about what Kevin will say about their relationship but is happy to finally be with her ("Sunrise"). Down the street, Usnavi, whose bodega has been looted, convenes with Abuela Claudia to discuss what will happen with the money. Abuela Claudia decides to give Sonny and Usnavi each a third of the money and urges Usnavi to use it to achieve his lifelong dream of returning to his home in the Dominican Republic. While Usnavi shares some doubts, he eventually decides to go ("Hundreds of Stories"). Nina eventually returns home to find her parents worried sick about her, and Kevin grows furious when he learns she was with Benny, disapproving of their relationship partially due to Benny not being Latino. Nina and Kevin loudly argue before Camila intervenes, criticizing Kevin for throwing Benny out and Nina for not coming home. She urges them to come together and work things out as a family ("Enough").

As the neighborhood copes with their frustration over the heat and blackout, Daniela urges them to dispel the negativity and muster up enough energy for a neighborhood celebration. As the block reluctantly begins making the most of a bad situation, Daniela leads the crowd in mocking Vanessa for not realizing Usnavi's feelings for her as well as Benny for his tryst with Nina the previous night. Usnavi soon emerges and announces Abuela Claudia's winning of the lottery as well as their flight for the Dominican Republic the following day. Vanessa is visibly upset by his leaving, and so is Sonny, who has long had a crush on Nina and whose only close relative is Usnavi. Usnavi calms Sonny down by revealing that they plan to give him a third of the lottery winnings and begins to rouse excitement throughout the block once more by encouraging them to celebrate before everything changes ("Carnaval del Barrio").

As they continue dancing and celebrating, a visibly upset Nina arrives and pulls Usnavi offstage, and soon Kevin makes an announcement over the dispatch: Abuela Claudia has suddenly died ("Atención"). Usnavi holds an impromptu memorial for Abuela Claudia, revealing that she died of "a combination of the stress and heat," and soon Nina leads the entire block in singing Abuela's praises ("Alabanza"). Afterward, Usnavi and Nina go through Abuela's old photographs to reminisce. Nina begins to remember the central role Abuela Claudia played in her education and motivation, and in memory of Abuela, she resolves to accept her parents' money and give college another try, returning to Stanford at the end of the summer ("Everything I Know"). As Vanessa prepares to move out, Daniela gives her a final piece of news: Usnavi convinced Daniela to cosign Vanessa's lease for her new apartment ("No Me Diga (Reprise)"). As the blackout continues, the Piragua Guy rejoices in the effect the heat has had on his business ("Piragua (Reprise)").

Overwhelmed by his kind act, Vanessa visits a flustered Usnavi as he cleans up the bodega and flirts with him, offering him a bottle of champagne. She quietly suggests to the distracted Usnavi that he should stay in the neighborhood, worried that if he leaves, she will never see him again, but Usnavi, overwhelmed, firmly rejects this. Vanessa kisses him before leaving, lamenting that she was too late in realizing her feelings for him ("Champagne"). As Nina tells Benny of her decision, they agree to spend the summer together before pursuing a long-distance relationship when she returns to school; Benny reaffirms his faith in her, and they promise to think of one another every day while they are apart ("When The Sun Goes Down"). Benny confronts Kevin for a final time, insisting that he was always there for him while Kevin never did the same. As the night winds down, Sonny approaches Graffiti Pete with a secret proposition, which Pete accepts.

The next morning the neighborhood has visibly changed: the car service sign over the Rosarios' building has been removed, and the grate in front of the bodega is still open. As Usnavi plays Abuela Claudia's old records, he comes to terms with the fact that the corner is about to change and wonders if anyone will notice that he's gone in the long run. Before he leaves, Sonny approaches him and, having fixed the bodega's grate, pulls it down, revealing a graffiti mural of Abuela Claudia painted by Pete. Seeing the mural, Usnavi has an epiphany and tasks Sonny and Graffiti Pete with telling the neighborhood of his decision to stay. As he reflects on his role as the neighborhood's storyteller, Usnavi ponders a potential future with Vanessa as he strives to ensure that his family's legacy is remembered and accepts the corner as his true home ("Finale").

Musical numbers

Act I
 "In the Heights" – Usnavi and Company
 "Breathe" – Nina and Company
 "Benny's Dispatch" – Benny and Nina
 "It Won't Be Long Now" – Vanessa, Usnavi, and Sonny
 "Inútil (Useless)" – Kevin
 "No Me Diga (You Don't Say)" – Daniela, Carla, Vanessa, and Nina
 "96,000" – Usnavi, Benny, Sonny, Vanessa, Daniela, Carla, Graffiti Pete, and Company
 "Paciencia y Fe (Patience and Faith)" – Abuela Claudia and Company
 "When You're Home" – Nina, Benny, and Company
 "Piragua" – Piragua Guy
 "Siempre (Always)" – Camila and Bolero Singer †
 "The Club" – Company
 "Blackout" – Company

Act II
 "Sunrise" – Nina, Benny, and Ensemble
 "Hundreds of Stories" – Abuela Claudia and Usnavi
 "Enough" – Camila
 "Carnaval del Barrio" – Daniela and Company
 "Atención" – Kevin
 "Alabanza" – Usnavi, Nina, and Company
 "Everything I Know" – Nina
 "No Me Diga (Reprise)" – Daniela, Carla, and Vanessa †
 "Piragua (Reprise)" – Piragua Guy
 "Champagne" – Vanessa and Usnavi
 "When the Sun Goes Down" – Nina and Benny
 "Finale" – Usnavi and Company

† Designates number not included on the original cast recording

Characters
 Usnavi de la Vega is the narrator of the musical's exposition and a major character throughout; he is the owner of a small bodega in Washington Heights called De La Vega Bodega. He was originally played by Lin-Manuel Miranda, songwriter of the musical. He was named after one of the first sights his parents saw when they arrived in America, a ship with the sign "US Navy" on it. Abuela Claudia, the neighborhood matriarch, "practically raised" him when his parents both died during his early childhood. He dreams of moving to the Dominican Republic. He is in love with Vanessa. 
 Nina Rosario is an intelligent girl, and the first in her family to go to college (Stanford University), and everyone in the barrio admires her as the "one who made it out." However, she returns home from school for the summer to reluctantly tell her parents that she has become overburdened and dropped out. She is the typical "good girl" and always got along with her parents. Upon arriving back home, though, she loses patience constantly over her father's overprotectiveness and his refusal to accept Benny, with whom she gets into a romantic relationship.
 Benny works at the dispatch of Nina's father, Kevin. The only character in the play who does not speak Spanish, Benny falls in love with Nina. He dreams of opening his own business.
 Vanessa Morales is Usnavi's love interest who works at Daniela's salon. She is stunningly beautiful and catches the eye of every guy in the Heights; however, she takes interest in Usnavi. She lives with an alcoholic mother and dreams of getting out of the barrio and getting an apartment downtown but cannot yet afford it.
 "Abuela" Claudia (“abuela" means "grandmother" in Spanish) is the loving matriarch of the barrio who is like a grandmother to all. She is the one who looked after Usnavi when his parents died. She and her mother moved from Cuba to New York in 1943 while she was a child. She worked as a maid for several years but never earned the money for her and her mother to travel home.
 Sonny de la Vega is Usnavi's sassy, superficially lazy, yet ambitious younger cousin who works with Usnavi in the bodega. He is a jokester, and has an intelligent and thoughtful side that yearns for social justice.
 Daniela is the outrageously dramatic owner of the salon where the neighborhood girls come to gossip. She is very bold and loud and loves to banter. 
 Carla works at Daniela's salon along with Vanessa, and is Daniela's close friend; young and pretty, but a little slow to get the others' jokes and innuendos, she is of Chilean, Cuban, Dominican, and Puerto Rican descent.
 Kevin Rosario is Nina's overprotective father, who, coming from a long line of farmers, has worked hard to resist following in his own father's footsteps. He now owns his own taxi cab service: Rosario's.
 Camila Rosario is Nina's strong-willed mother, who wants what is best for Nina. She is typically tolerant of Kevin's control issues, but in the course of the show, reveals her real feelings.
 Piragua Guy (Piragüero) is the owner of a small piragua stand that competes with Mister Softee.
 Graffiti Pete is a graffiti artist. He is good friends with Sonny and is one of the few characters who acknowledge Sonny's dreams. Usnavi believes Pete is a trouble-making vandal (constantly referring to him as a 'punk'), until Pete reveals his amazing skills as an artist.

Casts

Notable Broadway replacements
 Usnavi - Javier Muñoz, Corbin Bleu
 Nina - Janet Dacal, Jordin Sparks
 Benny - Joshua Henry (u/s)
 Daniela - Justina Machado, Bianca Marroquín
 Sonny - David Del Rio
 Carla - Gabrielle Ruiz

Notable West End replacements
 Vanessa - Christine Allado
 Daniela - Aimie Atkinson

Background
Miranda wrote the earliest draft of In the Heights in 1999 during his sophomore year of college. After the show was accepted by Wesleyan University's student theater company Second Stage, Miranda added "freestyle rap ... bodegas, and salsa numbers." It played from April 27 to 29, 2000, as an 80-minute, one-act show that reportedly sounded like "A hip-hop version of Rent". After seeing the play, two Wesleyan seniors and two alumni, John Buffalo Mailer, Neil Patrick Stewart, Anthony Veneziale and Thomas Kail, approached Miranda and asked if the play could be expanded with a view to a Broadway production. Miranda started working with director Kail in 2002 and wrote five separate drafts of In the Heights. Book writer Quiara Alegría Hudes joined the team in 2004.

Productions

Connecticut (2005) and off-Broadway (2007) tryouts
A new version of In the Heights was presented at the National Music Theater Conference at the Eugene O'Neill Theater Center in Waterford, Connecticut between July 23 and July 31, 2005, directed by Thomas Kail and with music director Alex Lacamoire. The cast featured Natalie Cortez, Janet Dacal, Robin de Jesús, Huey Dunbar, Christopher Jackson, Doreen Montalvo, Javier Muñoz, Rick Negron, Sheena Marie Ortiz, Matt Saldivar, Monica Salazar, and Nancy Ticotin

The musical then opened at the 37 Arts Theater off-Broadway, running from February 8, 2007, through July 15, 2007. Directed by Thomas Kail, with choreography by Andy Blankenbuehler and music direction by Alex Lacamoire, it was produced by Jill Furman, Kevin McCollum, Jeffrey Seller and Sander Jacobs. The off-Broadway production was nominated for nine Drama Desk Awards, winning two, as well as winning the Outer Critics' Circle Award for Outstanding Musical.

Broadway (2008–2011)
The musical premiered on Broadway, starting in previews on February 14, 2008, with an official opening on March 9, 2008, at the Richard Rodgers Theatre. The Broadway production was again directed and choreographed by Kail and Blankenbuehler, with most of the off-Broadway principals reprising their roles. The creative team included set design by Anna Louizos, costume design by Paul Tazewell, lighting design by Howell Binkley, sound design by Acme Sound Partners, arrangements and orchestrations by Alex Lacamoire and Bill Sherman, and music coordination by Michael Keller.

The producers announced on January 8, 2009, that the show had recouped its $10 million investment after 10 months. The cast recording was released on June 3, 2008, by Ghostlight Records and won the Grammy Award for Best Musical Show Album, beating the recordings of The Little Mermaid, Young Frankenstein, and the revivals of Gypsy and South Pacific. The Broadway production celebrated its 1000th performance on August 2, 2010.

The Broadway production closed on January 9, 2011, after 29 previews and 1,184 regular performances. The final cast included Lin-Manuel Miranda, Arielle Jacobs, Marcy Harriell, Shaun Taylor-Corbett, Olga Merediz, Andréa Burns, Christopher Jackson, Tony Chriroldes, Priscilla Lopez, and Jon Rua (understudy for the roles of Usnavi and Sonny for most of 2010).

North American tour (2009–2011)
The first national tour of In the Heights began on October 27, 2009, in Tampa, Florida. The musical ran in San Juan, Puerto Rico in November 2010, the first time an Equity tour has played in the city. Librettist Hudes and songwriter-star Miranda are both of Puerto Rican descent. Miranda played this engagement. The tour closed on April 3, 2011, at the Adrienne Arsht Center for the Performing Arts in Miami, Florida. At the time of its closing, the tour starred Joseph Morales as Usnavi.

Manila, Philippines (2011)
The international premiere ran in Manila, Philippines, from September 2 to 18, 2011. The new production was directed by Bobby Garcia and starred Nyoy Volante as Usnavi, Ima Castro as Vanessa, K-La Rivera as Nina Rosario, Felix Rivera as Benny, Calvin Millado as Kevin Rosario, Jackie Lou Blanco as Camila Rosario, Tex Ordoñez as Daniela, Tanya Manalang as Carla, Bibo Reyes as Sonny, and Jay Glorioso as Abuela Claudia. The show had a repeat run in March 2012.

Non-Equity US tour (2011–2012)
A non-Equity United States national tour of In the Heights ran from October 17, 2011, until June 2012. The tour played in Chicago in January 2012, with Virginia Cavaliere as Nina, Presilah Nunez as Vanessa, Kyle Carter as Benny, and Perry Young as Usnavi.

Panama City, Panama (2013) and São Paulo, Brazil (2014)
In Panama, In The Heights was performed by Instituto Alberto Einstein's student body from June 20 to June 25, notable performances by Valerie Cohen, Isidoro Cherem and Alegrita Angel, acting was made entirely in Spanish and songs sang in their original lyrics. Carnaval del Barrio (In the Heights) was staged at the famed Teatro en Círculo, from the October 3 to 31, 2013, produced by Top Line Events and directed by Aaron Zebede, who also adapted the book and songs to Spanglish. Jose "Pepe" Casis was the musical director, who also played the part of Piragua Guy.

The Brazilian premiere of Nas Alturas was staged at Teatro Bradesco from April 17 until May 25, 2014. The cast featured Myra Ruiz (Nina), Ricardo Marques (Benny), Mauro Gorini (Kevin), Germana Guilherme (Camila), Renata Brás (Daniela), Milena Martines (Carla), Lola Fanucchi (Vanessa), Thiago Vianna (Graffiti) and Rafael Dantas (Piragua Guy).

Off-West End, United Kingdom (2014)
The UK premiere of In The Heights was staged at Southwark Playhouse from 9 May until June 7, 2014. The cast featured Sam Mackay as Usnavi, Christina Modestou as Nina, Emma Kingston as Vanessa, David Bedella as Kevin Rosario and Victoria Hamilton-Barritt as Daniela, with direction by Luke Sheppard.

Tokyo, Japan (2014)
The Japanese premiere played in Bunkamura's Theatre Cocoon from April 9 until April 20, 2014, and featured Yuya Matsushita, Ayaka Umeda, Chihiro Otsuka, and Motomu Azaki, among others.

Melbourne, Australia (2015)
The Australian premiere of In The Heights, produced by StageArt, opened at Chapel Off Chapel on Feb 20 and ran for a short season of 21 shows, closing on March 8. Directed by James Cutler, Musical Direction by Cameron Thomas and choreographed by Yvette Lee, Starring Stephen Lopez in the title role of Usnavi. The show received overwhelming critical acclaim.

West End, United Kingdom (2015–2017)

In the Heights transferred to the King's Cross theatre, London on October 3, 2015. The production was directed by Luke Sheppard, choreographed by Drew McOnie with musical supervision by Tom Deering. The production was nominated for four awards at the 2016 Olivier Awards: Best New Musical, Best Theatre Choreographer (Drew McOnie), Outstanding Achievement in Music and Best Actor in a Supporting Role in a Musical (David Bedella). The performance of the production at the Olivier Awards was introduced by Jonathan Groff, in character as King George from Miranda's musical Hamilton. Following the end of his run in Hamilton, composer Lin-Manuel Miranda made a surprise visit to the production on September 4, 2016 while he was in London working on Mary Poppins Returns. The production closed on January 8, 2017, after a hugely successful run; with several extensions from its initial 4 month limited run. The final show was concluded with speeches by actor Sam Mackay and producer Paul Taylor Mills, and a surprise appearance by Lin-Manuel Miranda.

Vancouver, Canada and Seoul, South Korea (2015)
The Canadian premiere of In the Heights, produced by The Arts Club, opened at the Stanley Industrial Alliance Stage on May 6, 2015. Directed by Bill Millerd with co-direction and choreography by Lisa Stevens and musical direction by Ken Cormier. The cast featured Luc Roderique as Usnavi, Elena Juatco as Vanessa, Kate Blackburn as Nina, Chris Sams as Benny, Sharon Crandall as Abuela Claudia, Caleb Di Pomponio as Sonny, Francisco Trujillo as Kevin, Caitriona Murphy as Camila, Irene Karas Loeper as Daniela, Julia Harnett as Carla, Michael Culp as Graffiti Pete and Michael Antonakos as Piragua Guy.

The South Korean production opened in the Samsung Card Hall, Blue Square, Seoul on September 4, 2015. The production was scheduled to star numerous K-pop and hip hop musicians including Jeong Won-young, Yang Dong-geun, Jang Dongwoo of Infinite, and Key from Shinee as Usnavi, Seo Kyeong-su, Kim Sung-kyu of Infinite, and Chen from EXO as Benny, and Kim Bo-kyeong, Luna of f(x) as Nina.

Lima, Peru (2016)
Los Productores presented In the Heights during the first months of 2016. The premiere took place on January 20, 2016, at Luigi Pirandello Theater. The composition of the cast does not match those characteristics that the original work proposed. While the original work proposed racial diversity as an essential feature, the Peruvian version has a cast composed mainly of actors with white ancestry and not one single actor with Indigenous background. Gisela Ponce de León, a member of the cast, said, "Peruvians are experts in self-managed racism."

Lohne, Germany (2016)
The first ever German performance took place in May and June 2016 in Lohne and was an amateur production by the local high school. The musical was translated by Laura Friedrich Tejero and directed by Rainer Eschner and Stefan Middendorf.

US Spanish Premiere (2017)
Directed and choreographed by Luis Salgado, a member of the original Broadway Cast, and Assistant Latin Choreographer to Mr. Blankenbuehler, and presented by GALA Hispanic Theater, In The Heights had its Spanish Premiere in the US in April 2017. While Spanish-language versions of In the Heights have been produced in Latin America, this production is distinctive for several reasons: It is the first Spanish version of the show in the United States, it is the first Spanish translation sanctioned and approved by Lin-Manuel Miranda, and it is directed and choreographed by Luis Salgado, Assistant Latin Choreographer on the original Broadway production of In the Heights. The production included lyrics and scenes in Spanish, with elements from the original English, as well as an English anchor through the character of Benny. The production offered English and Spanish subtitles.

The production combined a varied Spanish speaking cast from countries including the Dominican Republic, Venezuela, Spain, Colombia, Peru, Mexico, Puerto Rico, Switzerland and the USA. It starred Juan Luis Espinal (Usnavi), Verónica Álvarez Robles (Vanessa), Laura Lebrón (Nina), Vaugh Midder (Benny), Scheherazade Quiroga (Daniela), Shadia Fairuz (Camila), Rafael Beato (Sonny), Michelle Ríos (Abuela Claudia), José Fernando Capellán (Kevin), Gabriella Pérez (Carla), Myriam Gadri (Graffity Pete) and Felix Marchany (Piragua Guy). The ensemble included: Ximena Salgado, Melinette Pallares, Natalia Raigosa, Amaya Perea, Aaron Cobos, José Ozuna and Hector Flores. The production garnered 18 nominations to the 2018 Helen Hayes Awards (the DC equivalent to the Tony Awards), more than any other DC production in the season, including Best Musical, Best Ensemble, Best Director, Best Choreography, Best Actor, Best Actress, Best Supporting Actress and Best Supporting Actor among others.

Nyborg, Denmark (2018)
The first ever Nordic performance took place in January and February 2018 at Bastionen theatre in Nyborg, Denmark. It was an amateur production by the Musical Talent School of Nyborg. It was translated into Danish and directed by Jesper Nielsen.

Saltillo, Mexico (2019)
The musical premiered in May 2019, in Teatro Fernando Soler. It was a semi-professional production in Spanish directed by Saul Martínez and produced by Cuarta Pared Teatro.

New Orleans, Louisiana, U.S.A., Regional Premiere (October 7–16, 2022) 
Produced by the Jefferson Performing Arts Society, directed and choreographed by Michelle Pietri with Assistant Choreographer AJ Hernandez, In The Heights had its Regional Premiere in The Jefferson Performing Arts Center on October 7, 2022. Maestro Dennis Assaf conducted The Jefferson Performing Arts Society Pit Orchestra.

The Scenic Designer was Eric Porter, the Lighting Designer was Jonathan Michael Gonzales and the Sound Designer was Kage Laney. The Wigs and Makeup Designer was Amanda Bravender, the Costume Designer was Arturo Hernandez, Jr., and the Props Designer was Olivia Winter. Mona Naswari was the Stage Manager.

The production combined a varied Spanish speaking cast from countries including the Dominican Republic, Venezuela, Colombia, Peru, Mexico, Puerto Rico, and Cuba. It starred Alcee Jones (Usnavi), Gia Martinez (Vanessa), Kelly Laines (Nina), Neal Eli (Benny), Skylar Broussard (Daniela), Elizabeth Lowry (Camila), Claudio Venancio (Sonny), Elana Polin (Abuela Claudia), Paul Bello (Kevin), Rachel Carter (Carla), Clarence Smith (Graffity Pete) and Adriel Aviles (Piragua Guy). The ensemble included: Gabriella Vazquez Harlamert (Dance Captain), Aubry Snipes, Graciela Gonzales, Aaliyah Thompson, Alejandra Dollis, Shiquita Brooks, Yorkel Ballesteros, David Hidalgo, Cal Desmith, Fransheska Peña, Joshua "Juice" Hernandez, AJ Hernandez, Aleyla Ybarra, Sophia Christilles and Stefan Armando Hernandez-San Martin.

Awards and nominations

Original Off-Broadway production

Original Broadway production

Original West End production

Reception
The reviews for the show were positive to mixed (the median grade of 9 major reviews was "B+"). Charles Isherwood's review in The New York Times said that "when this musical erupts in one of its expressions of collective joy, the energy it gives off could light up the George Washington Bridge for a year or two." Heather Bing of The Cleveland Plain Dealer wrote, "Although I was sometimes struggling to keep up with the hip-hop and Spanish-infused lyrics, the exciting set and choreography paired with excellent acting held my interest in the storyline." David Rooney's Variety review said, "That depth of feeling, together with the wit of Miranda's lyrics, the playful dexterity of his rhymes, his dynamic score and a bunch of truly winning performances, make the show an uncalculated charmer."

Hudes' book received mixed reviews. Charles McNulty's The Los Angeles Times review mentioned that "the downside to In the Heights is the book...which is overstuffed and oversimplified." The New York Post's Clive Barnes also gave negative comments about the book, saying that "Hudes' work is droopily sentimental and untruthful." Joe Dziemianowicz of the NY Daily News also disliked the book, but added that "what it lacks in story and believability it makes up for in a vibrant rap- and salsa-flavored score, spirited dances, and great-looking design."

Documentary
On May 27, 2009, PBS' Great Performances aired an episode entitled In the Heights: Chasing Broadway Dreams. It documents the journey taken by the cast and crew to bring the show to Broadway and to later win the Tony Award for Best Musical. Producer Andrew Fried and director Paul Bozymowski captured footage of the cast and creative team for over two years, from the off-Broadway production to their Tony Award wins. The special previewed at the Paley Center for Media in New York on May 4, 2009.

Film adaptation

In November 2008, Universal Pictures announced that they had acquired the rights to adapt the musical as a feature film for release in 2011. Kenny Ortega was set to direct it, and Quiara Alegría Hudes would write the screenplay. However, Universal opted not to develop the film, and the project was canceled. In January 2012, Lin-Manuel Miranda said the adaptation was back under discussion.

In May 2016, it was announced that The Weinstein Company would distribute the film. The following month, it was reported that Jon M. Chu was in talks to direct. In September 2016, Chu was confirmed as director, with production potentially beginning in spring 2017. Lin-Manuel Miranda said he would not return as Usnavi, the role he originated, but could return in another role.

In October 2017, Hudes revealed that she had asked The Weinstein Company to permit her to take the production elsewhere, in light of the Harvey Weinstein sexual abuse allegations. In April 2018, the film rights reverted to Miranda and Hudes. In May 2018, Warner Bros. Pictures acquired the film rights in a $50 million deal after a bidding war with several other studios. Warner Bros. originally set a release date of June 26, 2020. In October 2018, Anthony Ramos was cast as Usnavi. In January 2019, Corey Hawkins was cast as Benny. In April 2019, Jimmy Smits was cast as Kevin, Leslie Grace as Nina, Melissa Barrera as Vanessa, Stephanie Beatriz as Carla, Olga Merediz as Abuela Claudia (reprising her Tony nominated role from the original Broadway cast), Gregory Diaz IV as Sonny, Daphne Rubin-Vega (who did one of the radio voices in the original Broadway production) as Daniela, Lin-Manuel Miranda as Piragua Guy, and Dascha Polanco as Cuca.

Filming began on June 3, 2019, in New York. 
A teaser trailer was released on December 11, 2019, followed by a full trailer the next day. The film was scheduled to be released on June 26, 2020, in the United States, and on August 7, 2020, in the United Kingdom. However, it was delayed to June 10, 2021, due to the COVID-19 pandemic. The film had an opening weekend box office of $11.5 million worldwide.

See also
 Dominican Americans
 Nuyorican
 Puerto Ricans in New York City

References

External links
 
 
 The American Theatre Wing's Tony Awards – Meet the Nominees – In the Heights
 BroadwayWorld.com Show Preview – In the Heights

2007 musicals
American plays adapted into films
Broadway musicals
Off-Broadway musicals
West End musicals
Musicals by Lin-Manuel Miranda
Original musicals
Puerto Rican plays
Plays set in New York City
Rap operas
Tony Award for Best Musical
Plays set in the United States
Tony Award-winning musicals